The 2015 Handball at the European Youth Olympic Festival Women's tournament is the 10th edition, which takes place in Georgia. Denmark is the defending champion.

Qualified teams

Knockout stage

Group A

Group B

Knockout stage

Semifinals

Third place game

Final

Final standings

References 
  

2015 European Youth Summer Olympic Festival
Handball at the European Youth Summer Olympic Festival
2015 in handball